St David's Welsh Church, Rhosllannerchrugog, is in Broad Street, Rhosllannerchrugog, in Wrexham County Borough, Wales.

The church was built in 1892 to a design by Douglas and Fordham of Chester.  It consists of a nave and a north aisle.  It was intended  to have a chancel and a steeple at the northeast, but these were not built at the time.  The church is constructed in Ruabon brick with some sandstone dressings.  The west window is in Perpendicular style and the south porch has timberwork in its gable.  A chancel was added in 1935–36 to a design by J. H. Swainson.

St. David's has become part of the Offa Mission Area in the Church In Wales restructuring of Parishes for Vision 2020

See also
List of new churches by John Douglas

References

External links
 

Rhosllannerchrugog, St David's Church
Rhosllannerchrugog, St David's Church
Rhosllannerchrugog, St David's Church
Churches completed in 1892
Churches completed in 1936
Rhosllannerchrugog
Rhosllannerchrugog